The United States Air Force's Infrared Space Systems Directorate is located at Los Angeles Air Force Base.

Current and former designations:
Infrared Space Systems Directorate (2011–present)
Space-Based Infrared Systems Wing (197?-2011)

References

External links
 SBIRSW Fact Sheet
 Ars Technica: How US Satellites Pinpointed Source of Missile that Shot Down Airliner - July 19, 2014

Space-Based Infrared Systems Wing
Military units and formations in California